Cnesinus elegans is a species of beetles in the family Scolytinae. It is found in Mexico.

References 

 Biogeography and biology of bark and ambrosia beetles (Coleoptera: Scolytidae and Platypodidae) of a mesic montane forest in Mexico, with an annotated checklist. FA Noguera-Martinez and TH Atkinson, Annals of the Entomological Society of America, 1990
 A key to species of the Cnesinus LeConte (Coleoptera: Scolytidae) of North and Central America. SL Wood, The Great Basin Naturalist, 1968

External links 

 
 Cnesinus elegans at insectoid.info

Beetles described in 1896
Scolytinae
Insects of Mexico
Beetles of North America